Dragan Veselinovski (born 11 August 1968 in Bitola) is a Macedonian retired football player.

Club career
He captained Vardar in the Champions League.

International career
He made his senior debut for Macedonia in an August 1995 friendly match away against Turkey and has earned a total of 20 caps, scoring no goals. His final international was an August 2001 friendly against Saudi Arabia.

References

External links

Profile at FootballDatabase

1968 births
Living people
Sportspeople from Bitola
Association football defenders
Yugoslav footballers
Macedonian footballers
North Macedonia international footballers
FK Pelister players
FK Vardar players
FK Sileks players
FK Makedonija Gjorče Petrov players
FK Renova players
FK Drita players
Yugoslav Second League players
Macedonian First Football League players
Macedonian Second Football League players